Carin Franzén (born 1962)  is a Swedish literary scholar.

She graduated as dr.philos. in literary science in 1995, and is professor of language and literature at the Linköping University. Her works include the essay collection Till det omöjligas konst from 2010, Jag gav honom inte min kärlek. Om hövisk kärlek som kvinnlig strategi from 2012, and När vi talar om oss själva from 2018. She has also translated works from French into Swedish language, including psychoanalyst Jacques Lacan and philosopher Michel Foucault.

She was awarded the Dobloug Prize in 2019, along with Ernst Brunner, Johan Harstad and Olaug Nilssen.

References

1962 births
Living people
Academic staff of Linköping University
Swedish literary scholars
Swedish women academics
Dobloug Prize winners